The Marvels is an upcoming American superhero film based on Marvel Comics featuring the characters Carol Danvers / Captain Marvel, Kamala Khan / Ms. Marvel, and Monica Rambeau. Produced by Marvel Studios and distributed by Walt Disney Studios Motion Pictures, it is intended to be the sequel to the film Captain Marvel (2019), a continuation of the television series Ms. Marvel (2022), and the 33rd film in the Marvel Cinematic Universe (MCU). The film is directed by Nia DaCosta from a screenplay she co-wrote with Megan McDonnell, Elissa Karasik, and Zeb Wells. It stars Brie Larson as Carol Danvers, Iman Vellani as Kamala Khan, and Teyonah Parris as Monica Rambeau, alongside Samuel L. Jackson. In the film, Danvers, Khan, and Rambeau begin swapping places with each other every time they use their powers and must team-up.

Marvel Studios confirmed plans to make a sequel to Captain Marvel in July 2019, and development began in January 2020 with McDonnell joining and Larson set to return. DaCosta was hired that August, with Vellani and Parris revealed to be cast in December. Second unit filming began in mid-April 2021 in New Jersey, with the title revealed in early May. Principal photography had begun by early August 2021 and concluded by mid-May 2022, taking place at Pinewood Studios in Buckinghamshire and Longcross Studios in Surrey, England, as well as in Los Angeles and Tropea, Italy. The other screenwriters were revealed during post-production.

The Marvels is scheduled to be released in the United States on November 10, 2023, as part of Phase Five of the MCU.

Premise 
Following the events of Ms. Marvel (2022), Carol Danvers, Kamala Khan, and Monica Rambeau begin swapping places with each other every time they use their powers, and must team up to determine why.

Cast 
 Brie Larson as Carol Danvers / Captain Marvel:An Avenger and ex-U.S. Air Force fighter pilot whose DNA was altered during an accident, imbuing her with superhuman strength, energy projection, and flight.
 Iman Vellani as Kamala Khan / Ms. Marvel: A teenage mutant from Jersey City who idolizes Danvers and wears a magical bangle that unlocked her ability to harness cosmic energy and create hard light constructs. Khan is in awe of being in the presence of Danvers and Rambeau, her heroes, which producer Kevin Feige likened to Peter Parker's appearance in Captain America: Civil War (2016).
 Teyonah Parris as Monica Rambeau:An agent of S.W.O.R.D. with the ability to absorb energy. She is the daughter of Danvers' friend and fellow airman Maria Rambeau, and looked up to Danvers as a child. Parris said The Marvels would further explore Rambeau beyond what was established in WandaVision (2021).
 Samuel L. Jackson as Nick Fury: The former director of S.H.I.E.L.D. who is working with the Skrulls in deep space.

Saagar Shaikh, Zenobia Shroff, and Mohan Kapur reprise their respective roles from Ms. Marvel (2022) as Khan's older brother Aamir, mother Muneeba, and father Yusuf. Zawe Ashton has been cast as a villain, and Park Seo-joon has been cast in an undisclosed role. Goose, the Flerken who resembles a cat, returns from the first film.

Production

Development 
Ahead of the release of Captain Marvel (2019), star Brie Larson expressed interest in a sequel featuring the character Kamala Khan / Ms. Marvel. Producer Kevin Feige previously said there were plans to introduce Khan in the Marvel Cinematic Universe (MCU) following the release of Captain Marvel since Khan is inspired by Carol Danvers / Captain Marvel; Iman Vellani was later cast as Khan for the Disney+ television series Ms. Marvel (2022). In March 2019, Feige said Marvel Studios had some "pretty amazing" ideas for a sequel, which could either be set in the 1990s like the first film, or the present day. Lashana Lynch expressed interest in reprising her role of Maria Rambeau in a sequel, even if it was set in the present. At the 2019 San Diego Comic-Con in July, Feige confirmed plans for a sequel.

Official development on the film began in January 2020, when Megan McDonnell entered negotiations to write the script after serving as a staff writer on Marvel Studios' Disney+ series WandaVision (2021). Larson was confirmed to return as Danvers, but Anna Boden and Ryan Fleck were not expected to return after directing and co-writing the first film. The studio hoped to hire a female director to replace them. The film was expected to be set in the present day, and was aiming for a 2022 release. In April 2020, Disney scheduled the film for release on July 8, 2022, filling the July 2022 date that the studio had previously reserved for an untitled Marvel film. Nia DaCosta was hired to direct the film that August. Deadline Hollywood Justin Kroll called this another sign of Marvel Studios adding diversity to its films due to DaCosta being the first Black woman hired as a director by the studio, adding that the film would likely break the record for the biggest-budgeted film directed by a Black woman. The studio had also considered Olivia Wilde and Jamie Babbit as directors for the film, but DaCosta was said to have been the frontrunner for some time. DaCosta, a self-professed comic book nerd, developed the film with WandaVision producer Mary Livanos, whom she said gave her "creative latitude" so the film would not "be a puppet on a string". Larson said DaCosta was the "best person for the job" and said her presentation to pitch the film was incredible, and also noted her confidence in her work. Richard Newby of The Hollywood Reporter said DaCosta's hiring could bring new energy to the MCU and Captain Marvel franchise, saying she "enjoys challenging preconceived notions about the relationship between characters and the lore behind stories". Newby also felt the film could explore Danvers' story from the perspective of Maria Rambeau's daughter Monica, a Black woman in present-day America.

Feige announced Captain Marvel 2 in December 2020, with a new release date of November 11, 2022. He confirmed DaCosta's involvement, and revealed that Vellani would reprise her role as Khan and Teyonah Parris would reprise her role as Monica Rambeau from WandaVision. Parris was excited to work with DaCosta again after Candyman (2021), and to further explore Monica's relationship with Danvers that was teased in WandaVision.

Pre-production 
Pre-production work on the film was starting by February 2021, when Zawe Ashton was cast as the film's villain. By that time, all of the scripts for Ms. Marvel had been written, so The Marvels creative team was able to read those to know what happened to Khan in that series, with Larson also having a cameo appearance in that series. Principal photography was expected to begin at the end of May, though some second unit filming began on April 9 in Jersey City, New Jersey, under the working title Goat Rodeo, to capture aerial footage, establishing shots, and green screen plates. In May, Marvel Studios revealed that the sequel would be titled The Marvels. Ethan Anderton of /Film noted that this title refers to both Captain Marvel and Ms. Marvel, since the film's logo includes the same stylized "S" from the Ms. Marvel series' logo. Graeme McMillian at The Hollywood Reporter acknowledged this explanation, but also wondered if there was a connection to the 1994 comics series Marvels—which tells various Marvel Universe events from the perspective of a photographer—or a project of the same name announced in 2020. He also wondered if "The Marvels" referred to a family of heroes, much like DC Comics' Marvel Family (now known as the Shazam Family). Later that month, pre-production work was starting in the United Kingdom. Park Seo-joon was cast in an undisclosed role in mid-June, and was set to join the production after completing work on the film Concrete Utopia. Larson and Parris began preparing for filming the next month. DaCosta said The Marvels would deal with "specific, personal, [and] sometimes sad things", such as how people deal with pain and trauma, but would have a lighter story than her films Little Woods (2018) and Candyman. She felt that she had more creative freedom on The Marvels than on her prior films. Feige said that the dynamic between Danvers, Khan, and Rambeau was the center of the film and likened their team-up to the formation of the Avengers in The Avengers (2012). He revealed that The Marvels would have "fun cosmic elements", including some from Roy Thomas' 1971 "Kree–Skrull War" comic book storyline, with the story directly picking up from the ending of Captain Marvel. He described the film as being tonally different from the MCU series Secret Invasion, another Captain Marvel follow-up.

Filming 
Principal photography was expected to begin on May 31, 2021, and had begun by August 10, at Pinewood Studios in Buckinghamshire, and at Longcross Studios in Longcross, Surrey, England. Sean Bobbitt served as cinematographer. Around the start of filming, Samuel L. Jackson revealed that he would reprise his MCU role as Nick Fury in the film, working on it in London at the same time as he was preparing to film Secret Invasion. Filming for The Marvels took place in Tropea, Italy, beginning on August 27, including on the coast of the Tyrrhenian Sea. On September 3, Park left for Los Angeles to begin filming. Shortly after, Saagar Shaikh, Zenobia Shroff, and Mohan Kapur were revealed to be reprising their respective roles as Khan's older brother Aamir, mother Muneeba, and father Yusuf, from Ms. Marvel. In October 2021, the film's release was delayed to February 17, 2023. Park shot his scenes for two months, and completed filming in England by November 2. Production designer Cara Brower said the scale and scope of the film were massive, contrasting her work with DaCosta on Candyman. In April 2022, the film's release was moved to July 28, 2023, swapping places with Ant-Man and the Wasp: Quantumania given that film was further along in production than The Marvels, which still had some filming left to occur. Filming had wrapped by the middle of the following month.

Post-production 
Jackson revealed in mid-June 2022 that he would return to London in August to work on reshoots for The Marvels, before doing the same for Secret Invasion, and Marvel was preparing for those reshoots by the end of July. Filming occurred in early August in Battery Park in New York City to capture visual effects plates. DaCosta was revealed in January 2023 to have also worked on the film's script alongside Elissa Karasik and Zeb Wells, who had respectively served as a writer on Marvel Studios' Loki (2021–present) and She-Hulk: Attorney at Law (2022). In February 2023, the film's release was delayed to November 10, 2023, as Disney and Marvel Studios were re-evaluating their content output and costs. This allowed more time for post-production. Catrin Hedström serves as the editor of the film, after working with DaCosta on Candyman.

Music 
In January 2022, Laura Karpman was hired to compose the score for the film, after previously doing so for the first season of the MCU television series What If...? (2021) and Ms. Marvel.

Marketing 
Larson, Parris, and Vellani appeared at the 2022 D23 Expo to promote the film and show exclusive footage.

Release 
The Marvels is scheduled to be released in the United States on November 10, 2023. It was previously scheduled for July 8, 2022, November 11, 2022, February 17, 2023, and July 28, 2023. It will be part of Phase Five of the MCU.

References

External links 
  at Marvel.com
 

2020s American films
2020s English-language films
2020s superhero films
2023 science fiction films
African-American superhero films
American action films
American science fiction action films
American sequel films
Captain Marvel (film series)
Films directed by Nia DaCosta
Films shot at Longcross Studios
Films shot at Pinewood Studios
Films shot in Italy
Films shot in Los Angeles
Films shot in New Jersey
Films with screenplays by Megan McDonnell
Marvel Cinematic Universe: Phase Five films
Science fiction adventure films
Superhero crossover films
Superhero films about Asian Americans
Teen superhero films
Upcoming sequel films